Joseph or Joe Andrew may refer to:

Joe Andrew (born 1960), American politician and lawyer, national chairman of the Democratic National Committee 
Joe Andrew (academic) (born 1948), Keele University professor
Joe Andrew (footballer) (1889–1982), Australian rules footballer

See also

Joseph Andrews (disambiguation)